The New York Film Critics Circle Award for Best Cinematographer is one of the annual awards given by the New York Film Critics Circle.

List of winners

See also
Academy Award for Best Cinematography

References

New York Film Critics Circle Awards
Awards for best cinematography
Awards established in 1980